Kubihal is a village in Dharwad district of Karnataka, India.

Demographics 
As of the 2011 Census of India there were 657 households in Kubihal and a total population of 3,683 consisting of 1,915 males and 1,768 females. There were 456 children ages 0-6.

References

Villages in Dharwad district